The Rallye de France Alsace was a rally competition held in the Alsace region of France. The rally took place on roads in the Vosges mountains, as well as on similar vineyard tracks to Rallye Deutschland.

In 2010, it became the French round of the World Rally Championship, the Rallye de France, replacing the Tour de Corse rally in Corsica. After 5 editions, it was revealed in a meeting in January 2015 in Paris that the rally would no longer be part of the World Rally Championship due to local authorities in the Alsace region withdrawing support. The French round of the World Rally Championship returned to Tour de Corse in 2015.

Winners

References

External links 

 Rallye de France Alsace 
 Fédération Française du Sport Automobile
 Rallye de France - Alsace at eWRC-results

 
Recurring sporting events established in 2010
Recurring sporting events disestablished in 2014
France